Bare, also known as Bare: A Pop Opera, is a coming-of-age rock musical with music by Damon Intrabartolo, lyrics by Jon Hartmere, and a book by Hartmere and Intrabartolo. The story focuses on a group of high school students and their struggles at their private Catholic boarding school.

The musical was later revised as Bare: The Musical.

Productions
The musical debuted at the Hudson Theatre in Los Angeles, running from October 14, 2000 to February 25, 2001. The New York production of Bare at the American Theatre of Actors Off-Broadway, ran from April 19 to May 27, 2004. The Los Angeles and New York productions were both directed by Kristin Hanggi.

Bare had its Canadian premiere in summer 2009 at the Hart House Theatre, Toronto, directed by Bri Waters. Bare had its Sydney premiere in September 2010 at the New Theatre, as part of the Sydney Fringe Festival.

Bare had also been produced in the Philippines by the Ateneo de Manila University in 2009, with the initial run hosted by the undergraduate musical theatre organisation Ateneo Blue Repertory.

A new production of the original version has been produced again in Los Angeles, this time at the Hayworth Theatre. It opened on September 6, 2013, produced by Topher Rhys and Jamie Lee Barnard for glory|struck Productions, directed by Calvin Remsberg, choreographed by Jen Oundjian with musical direction by Elmo Zapp.

On June 20, 2015, Bare had its Welsh premiere in Cardiff, at the YMCA Cardiff Theatre by Penny Productions, directed by Jay Coleman with musical direction by Connor Fogel. This amateur production starred Glen Jordan as Peter, Scott Jenkins as Jason, Emily John as Ivy, Alice Urrutia as Nadia, Alex Reynolds as Sister Chantelle and Phil Paisey as the Priest.

On July 6, 2017, Bare made its premiere in Brighton, an established LGBTQ destination nicknamed the "unofficial gay capital of the UK". Produced by Brief Hiatus, this production was directed by Conor Baum with choreography by Sarah-Leanne Humphreys, receiving critical acclaim.

Synopsis

Act I
At St. Cecilia's Boarding School, Peter dozes off during Mass and has a nightmare in which he is outed as gay and condemned by everyone ("Epiphany"). After Mass, he sees Jason, his roommate and secret lover. Jason reassures Peter about their relationship and Peter suggests that they audition for the school play ("You & I"). Alone, Peter reflects on his anxieties about his relationship with Jason ("Role of a Lifetime"). Jason shows up to the auditions for Romeo and Juliet at the last minute and competes with another student, Matt, for the part of Romeo. Drama teacher Sister Chantelle casts Jason as Romeo and Ivy as Juliet ("Auditions"). Nadia, Jason's overweight twin sister, is upset that she was cast as the Nurse and commiserates with Jason over their overbearing parents ("Plain Jane Fat Ass").

Matt tries to plan a small surprise birthday party for Ivy, with whom he is in love. Lucas, the school's party boy, organizes a trip to a rave, bringing ecstasy and other drugs ("Wonderland"). Insecure about her appearance, Nadia decides to stay behind ("A Quiet Night at Home"). At the rave, Peter dances with Jason and Ivy with Matt ("Rolling"). Peter tries to kiss Jason, who leads him outside. Peter wants to make their relationship public but Jason is afraid ("Best Kept Secret"). They kiss but unbeknownst to them, Matt sees them together. The next morning, at Confession, Matt and Peter ask for guidance about their respective secrets: Matt about seeing the kiss and Peter about being gay ("Confession").

After Nadia jokes about Ivy's promiscuity, Ivy reflects on the way her reputation defines and confines her ("Portrait of a Girl"). Nadia turns Ivy's birthday party into a crude and uproarious event ("Birthday, Bitch!"). Peter unknowingly eats pot brownies and flirts with Jason. A drunk Ivy does the same and Jason chooses her over Peter to save face. Ivy asks Jason to kiss her as a birthday gift and he reluctantly agrees ("One Kiss"). Matt and Peter bond over their frustrations and an inebriated Peter tells Matt the secret of his relationship with Jason ("Are You There?"). Peter later has a vision of the Virgin Mary, in the form of Sister Chantelle, telling him that he needs to come out to his mother ("911! Emergency!").

At rehearsal, Matt abandons the script and tackles Jason, calling him a homophobic slur ("Reputation Stain'd"). Peter asks Jason to come home with him for spring break and help him come out to his mother. Jason panics, afraid of his father finding out, and breaks up with Peter ("Ever After"). While Nadia sardonically sings about her dislike of spring, Peter leaves for break without speaking to Jason ("Spring"). Ivy apologizes to Jason for her actions at the party, but admits that she likes him and hopes for more. While Peter and Matt pine for their respective loves and Nadia wishes to be noticed, Jason sleeps with Ivy, hoping it is the right thing to do ("One").

Act II
The school chapel is decorated elaborately for Peter and Jason's wedding. The scene turns into Jason's wedding to Ivy and reveals itself to be Peter's nightmare ("Wedding Bells"). Later, class ranks are posted and Jason has achieved the valedictorian spot, once again besting Matt ("In the Hallway"). Ivy tells Jason that though she has been with other boys before, he is her first true love. After realizing that Ivy's feelings are the way he feels about Peter, he breaks up with her ("Touch My Soul"). Peter calls his mother Claire, intending to come out. She continually evades the subject, though he suspects she already knows the truth ("See Me"). Claire hangs up, shaken at the confirmation of her fears, but eventually recognizes that her love for him is stronger than her religious objections ("Warning").

When Ivy misses rehearsal, her understudy Diane steps in but forgets her lines. Peter temporarily takes over and dances with Jason ("Pilgrim's Hands"). Ivy appears at the end of the rehearsal and insists to Jason that they need to speak privately. Sister Chantelle tells Peter that she knows what has been bothering him—that he is gay—and assures him that he is just as God wanted him to be ("God Don't Make No Trash"). Ivy tells Nadia that she is pregnant with Jason's child ("All Grown Up"). She later finds Jason practicing his graduation speech and tells him that she is pregnant and still hopes he might learn to love her back. Matt, who has overheard them, reveals that Jason is in love with Peter. Peter arrives and he, Matt, and Jason exchange heated words as the other students look on ("Promise").

Distraught, Jason reflects on his relationship with Peter, and how even through his fear, he knows that it is the only thing that will comfort him ("Once Upon a Time"). With nowhere else to go, he asks the priest at Confession if God still loves him and can forgive him. The priest tells him that he must deny his feelings ("Cross"). Backstage before the play, Lucas passes out drug orders to students, including Jason. Jason asks Peter to run away with him but Peter refuses, not wanting to hide anymore ("Two Households"). Jason, thinking that he has lost Peter for good, takes a large dose of GHB.

As the play begins, he again pulls Peter aside and tells him that he has loved him since they first met. Peter tells him he loves him too and reassures him that their parting is not a permanent goodbye ("Bare"). As Peter delivers the Queen Mab speech, Jason becomes increasingly disoriented and begins to hallucinate ("Queen Mab"). During the masked ball scene, he collapses and dies in Peter's arms ("A Glooming Peace"). Peter confronts the priest about Jason's last visit, accusing him of failing to show compassion ("Absolution"). At graduation, Peter, Ivy, Matt, and Nadia wonder whether they could have prevented Jason's death and consider the role they played in it. They move forward into a world that will yield more questions than answers ("No Voice").

Characters and original casts

Musical numbers

Act I
 "Epiphany" — Company
 "You & I" — Jason, Peter, and Students
 "Role of a Lifetime" — Peter
 "Auditions" — Chantelle and Students
 "Plain Jane Fat Ass"† — Nadia and Jason
 "Wonderland" — Matt, Nadia, Tanya, Lucas, Ivy, Peter, and Jason
 "A Quiet Night at Home" — Nadia
 "Rolling" — Band
 "Best Kept Secret" — Jason and Peter
 "Confession" — Priest and Students
 "Portrait of a Girl" — Ivy and Matt
 "Birthday, Bitch!" — Students
 "One Kiss" — Ivy and Jason
 "Are You There?" — Matt and Peter
 "911! Emergency!"‡ — Mary and Cherubs
 "Reputation Stain'd" — Ivy, Jason, Peter, Matt, and Nadia
 "Ever After" — Peter and Jason
 "Spring" — Nadia
 "One" — Ivy, Jason, Nadia, Matt, and Peter

Act II
 "Wedding Bells" — Company
 "In The Hallway" — Band
 "Touch My Soul" — Ivy and Jason
 "See Me" — Peter and Claire
 "Warning" — Claire
 "Pilgrims' Hands" — Jason and Peter
 "God Don't Make No Trash" — Chantelle
 "All Grown Up" — Ivy
 "Promise" — Jason, Ivy, Matt, Nadia, and Peter
 "Once Upon a Time" — Jason
 "Cross" — Jason and Priest
 "Two Households" — Students
 "Bare" — Jason and Peter
 "Queen Mab" — Jason and Peter
 "A Glooming Peace" — Students
 "Absolution" — Peter and Priest
 "No Voice" — Company

† Cut from the 2004 Off-Broadway production and replaced with "Love, Dad"

‡ Replaced "Mother Love" from the 2000 Los Angeles production

Album
An 11-song CD sampler featuring the 2004 New York cast was offered to every ticket buyer during the final performances of the Off-Broadway run. The full studio album from Bare, produced by Deborah Lurie and Casey Stone, was released on October 30, 2007, as a three-disc CD + DVD set. The 2012–2013 production was announced to be releasing a cast album. This, however, did not occur due to the quick closing of the revival amid poor reviews and public response.

Planned film adaptation
On January 2, 2018, it was announced that Bare would be made into a motion picture, directed by Kristin Hanggi and produced by Hillary Butorac Weaver and Janet Billig Rich. Hanggi will adapt the screenplay for the film. No release date has been set.

References

External links
 

2000 musicals
Off-Broadway musicals
Original musicals
LGBT-related musicals
Rock musicals
Sung-through musicals
Catholicism in fiction
Plays and musicals based on Romeo and Juliet